Thomas Robins Bolitho  (1840–1925) was an English banker and landowner, who served as High Sheriff of Cornwall in 1890.

Early life and education 
Bolitho was born on 13 September 1840 in Penzance, the son of Thomas Simon Bolitho (1808–1877) and Elizabeth Robins. The Bolithos were an old Cornish family from Madron which found its fortune in trading and banking, by 1885, they were known as the "merchant princes" of Cornwall. He was educated at Harrow School and at Corpus Christi College, Oxford.

Career
He joined his family's banking company, Robins, Foster, Coode and Bolitho Co., in 1880, and was a director from 1887, and when that company was taken over by Barclays Bank in 1905, became a director of the latter.

He was married to Augusta Jane Wilson on 30 June 1870, in Westminster. In 1877, he inherited Trengwainton, a country house near Penzance, from his father.

He was High Sheriff of Cornwall in 1890.

Bolitho retired from Barclays in 1918 and died on 28 September 1925, without issue. He left Trengwainton to his nephew, Edward Hoblyn Warren Bolitho.

His cousin Thomas Bedford Bolitho (1835–1915), a Liberal Unionist, was MP for St Ives, from 1887 to 1900.

Legacy 
The Thomas Simon Bolitho Institute was established in Landithy some time between 1909 and 1920.

The Great Western Railway's 'Saint' class locomotive number 173 (later 2973), was named Robins Bolitho upon its creation in March 1905, in his honour.

An etching of a painting of Bolitho on his horse, by Alfred Munnings, titled Thomas Robins Bolitho On Barum. Master of The Western Fox Hounds Since 1864 is in the collection of Penlee House. A study for the work, comprising three portrait sketches of Bolitho, also survives.

A "Robins Bolitho Challenge Shield" was presented to the GWR's Truro Ambulance Team, in 1921, and, by "Mrs Robins Bolitho", to their Penzance (No1) team in 1927.

Notes

References

Further reading

External links 

 Colour print of the Munnings painting
 Photograph of a memorial to Bolitho at St Maddern's Church, Madron

1840 births
1925 deaths
People from Penzance
19th-century English people
20th-century English people
English bankers
High Sheriffs of Cornwall
Barclays people
English justices of the peace
Alumni of Corpus Christi College, Oxford
People educated at Harrow School